Kyrgyzstan has close relations with other members of the Commonwealth of Independent States, particularly Kazakhstan and  Russia, given the historical legacy of the Soviet Union. It also has close relations with Turkey as well, given their shared heritage as Turkic languages.  

While Kyrgyzstan was initially determined to stay in the ruble zone, the stringent conditions set forth by the Russian Government prompted Kyrgyzstan to introduce its own currency, the som, in May 1993. Kyrgyzstan's withdrawal from the ruble zone was done with little prior notification and initially caused tensions in the region. Both Kazakhstan and Uzbekistan temporarily suspended trade, and Uzbekistan even introduced restrictions tantamount to economic sanctions. Both nations feared an influx of rubles and an increase in inflation. Uzbekistan and Kazakhstan's hostility toward Kyrgyzstan was short-lived, and the three nations signed an agreement in January 1994 creating an economic union. This led to the relaxation of border restrictions between the nations the following month. Kyrgyzstan also has contributed to the CIS peacekeeping forces in Tajikistan.

Turkey has sought to capitalize on its cultural and ethnic links to the region and has found Kyrgyzstan receptive to cultivating bilateral relations. The Kyrgyz Republic also has experienced a dramatic increase in trade with the People's Republic of China, its southern neighbor. Kyrgyzstan has been active in furthering regional cooperation, such as joint military exercises with Uzbek and Kazakh troops.

In January 1999, a new OSCE office opened in Bishkek; on February 18, 2000 the OSCE announced that an additional office would open in Osh to assist Bishkek in carrying out its work. Kyrgyzstan is a member of the OSCE, the CIS, and the United Nations.

Diplomatic relations 

As of December 2022, Kyrgyzstan has diplomatic relations with 168 UN members, Holy See and the State of Palestine.

Bilateral relations

See also
 List of diplomatic missions in Kyrgyzstan
 List of diplomatic missions of Kyrgyzstan

References

External links
Kyrgyzstan risks becoming narcotics transit-state - drugs tsar
Most Kyrgyz residents believe country should give priority to Russia -poll